Casamigos, often Casamigos Tequila is an American tequila company  founded by George Clooney, Rande Gerber and Mike Meldman. It is owned by Diageo since 2017.

Casamigos went on to become the fastest-growing spirits brand of 2022. Friends Gerber and Clooney started the company intending to make tequila according to their personal tastes and for their personal use, with no intent of taking the company public. The name Casamigos comes from the Spanish casa (house) and amigos (friends), thus "house of friends."

It was purchased in June 2017 by the multinational beverage company Diageo for $700 million plus up to a further $300 million based on the brand's performance. The purchase equated to Diageo paying almost $500 a bottle.

See also

List of tequilas

References

External links

Tequila
Diageo brands
Alcoholic drink brands
American companies established in 2013
2017 mergers and acquisitions